Electronic scoring systems or electronic targets are automated scoring systems used for sport shooting where the shot placement and score is automatically calculated using electronics and presented on screens to the organizer and shooters. The score may also be shown on a big screen for audience at the shooting range, and this has in many ways revolutionized the shooting sport.

With traditional paper targets, the audience of a shooting match may have to understand the signals used for scoring and monitor the scores of multiple targets at once, whereas, with electronics, the current scores can be shown on screens immediately after the shot is fired, allowing the audience to quickly see how different shooters compare to each other. Electronic targets automatically gauge the hits so that no physical inspection of hits is needed. Some systems even allow real time publishing on the internet. Scoring can also be held back by the Range Officer (the shooting supervisor) until the string of fire is finished in order to show the scores for each competitor in ascending order.

Usage 

Electronic targets are used for all types of sport shooting. Guns range from 10 meter air rifles to over 1000 meter long range shooting competitions; targets range from "running targets" (targets that move on rails), like the ISSF 50 meter running target or those used in running moose competitions, to electronic knock down targets, which are often used by many militaries. Targets are available for calibers ranging from air gun pellets up to the 105 mm tank shell.

Advantages 
Some advantages of electronic scoring systems are that:
 It makes organizing matches easier, since the scores are calculated automatically.
 It provides the shooter immediate and precise feedback, and can be used for training and competition.
 Real time scoring is often more exciting to the audience, as they do not have to wait for scores to come in.

Disadvantages 
Some disadvantages of electronic scoring systems are that:
 There are relatively high construction costs, and often a need for continuous maintenance.
 They can be vulnerable to lightning strikes because of long cables in the ground combined with sensitive electronics.
 The cables around the target stand are vulnerable to bullets. This can especially be a problem in speed shooting competitions where some of the shots may miss the target. To protect the cables, brackets made of hardened steel have been used in Stang shooting (Stangskyting) and Nordic field rapid shooting (Felthurtigskyting).

Mechanism 
All types of electronic targets use some form of trigonometric equations to triangulate the position of bullet impact.

Sound triangulation 
Sound-chamber targets are the oldest type of electronic targets, and use the Mach wave of the bullet to determine its position as it passes through the target. The first sound-chamber system for big-bore rifles was patented in 1975, and was used for the first time in a world championship in 1982.

It functions by using microphones to measure the sound wave of the projectile as it passes through the target. The target is built like a frame and covered with rubber sheets on the front and back, providing an almost sound-tight chamber. Inside the chamber there are microphones, either three in the bottom of the frame, or one in each of the four corners. Additionally, the air temperature inside the target is measured to precisely calculate the speed of sound. To avoid large temperature fluctuations, the target is insulated in the front and back using insulating material such as styrofoam, and the target seen by the shooter is painted on the insulation material. To keep the sound-chamber somewhat tight, there is an additional rubber liner outside the main rubber liner, which can be turned manually or with an electric motor at certain intervals to prevent the holes in the sound chamber from becoming too large.

Light triangulation 
In 2010, Sius Ascor released Laserscore, the first electronic target system using lasers: it is able to determine the position of a bullet with a claimed accuracy of a few hundredths of a millimeter by using three infrared lasers. Since the measuring method is optical and there are no moving parts, the target is almost free from wear and maintenance.

Piezoelectric sensors triangulation 
In 2018, Sport Quantum released an impact measuring technology using piezoelectric sensors on a plate. This enabled new generation interactive shooting targets : plate protected screens for pellets, or armored still plates for large calibres. Interactive shooting screens combine precise impact measurement and an unlimited choice of targets.

Data transmission 
Data can be transferred either wirelessly or through cables. Cables are often used for permanent installations, while wireless radio transmissions are used for targets placed provisionally in the field and for running targets.

Manufacturers 
Some well known manufacturers are:
 Ariosoren of Iran (link)
 Disag of Germany (link)
 Elite scorer of India (link)
 ETSys	(Electronic Target Systems) of Great Britain (link)
 HEX Systems of Australia (link)
 INTARSO (formerly Häring) of Germany (link)
 Kongsberg Target Systems (formerly Kongsberg Mikroelektronikk) of Norway (link)
 Megalink of Norway (link)
 Meyton Elektronik of Germany (link)
 SETA Target Systems of Germany (link)
 SIUS AG Switzerland (link)
 Sport Quantum of France (link)
 Tachus of India
 TrueZeroTarget of Norway (link)
 Polytronic of Switzerland (link)
 Secapem of France ( link )
 Silver Mountain Targets of Canada (link)
 Spieth of Germany (link)
 Suooter Tech of China (link)

Distributors

Open source 

 freETarget is an open source project for an electronic target using acoustic detection with a projected build cost of under 100 USD. 

 BidaSius is an open source project for electronic target. It uses webcam and computer  for image processing. For now it is available for 10m Air Pistol only. Hobbyist can build an electronic target for less than US$50.

 E-Targ is an open source project with the goal of publishing free research, designs, schematics and software, etc. so that hobbyists can build an electronic target for under 50 USD. The system is supposed to be portable, accurate within 5 mm, plot impact locations quickly and transmit the data wirelessly to a laptop or smartphone. A beta version was presented by Matthew Waterman and Donato Salazar as a school project at the Northern Illinois University in 2011, and from there the plan is to involve others to develop the project further.

The thesis includes building instructions and complete programming, together with a more in depth explanation of the physics and mathematical formulas used, which gives a good foundation for further development. During the project both "soft targets" (targets with a sound chamber) and "hard targets" (without sound chamber) were tested, and hard targets were the most successful giving an electronic precision of 2 cm (.8 inches). To function satisfactorily, E-Targ suggests that the electronic precision should be at least 10 times better than the expected precision of the shooter.

See also 
 Steel target

References

External links 
 Video: Kongsberg Target Systemt - Animation of How It Works
 Video: Silver Mountain Targets How It Works
 Video: An Overview of SIUS Electronic Target and Scoring Systems
Video: Sport Quantum SQ10 Interactive Target
 Scatt online viewer and database

Shooting sports